Abassi Boinaheri (born 23 October 1976) is a retired French footballer who played as a striker.

He played professionally for FC Martigues in Division 1 and Division 2, having made his debut in a 3–0 defeat at Nantes on 18 February 1995. After seven seasons with Martigues, he joined Stade Beaucairois in 2001. Boinaheri played for ES Vitrolles in 2002 and then had a brief spell with Toulon in 2003. He played for US Marignane in 2004 and had a trial with Football League club Swansea City in November of that year. He spent a season with Marseille Endoume before joining US Marignane in 2006.

References

External links
 
 Abassi Boinaheri at Foot National
 

1976 births
Living people
French footballers
Association football forwards
Ligue 1 players
Ligue 2 players
FC Martigues players
SC Toulon players
Marignane Gignac Côte Bleue FC players
US Marseille Endoume players
Stade Beaucairois players